Abdul Hameed Dogar is a Pakistani jurist who served as the former Justice of Sindh High Court, before being appointed Chief Justice of Pakistan by President Pervez Musharraf, after he dismissed the superior judiciary and declared emergency rule in 2007.

Following Musharraf's resignation, the judiciary was restored in 2009. On 31 July 2009, the Supreme Court of Pakistan ruled that the taking oath on  Provisional Constitutional Order (PCO) was not legal and that Justice Dogar was never a Constitutional Chief Justice of Pakistan, as the office of the Chief Justice of Pakistan was never vacant by the de jure Chief Justice, hence treated him the de facto Chief Justice of Pakistan by protecting his all administrative, financial acts and any oath made before him in the ordinary course of affairs of the office of the Chief Justice of Pakistan, except the recommendations made by him in respect of appointments and reappointments for the offices of the superior judges.
Following the Proclamation of Emergency by General Pervez Musharraf as Chief of Army Staff, on 3 November 2007, Justice Dogar took oath on PCO and was administered the oath of office of Chief Justice of Pakistan.

Life
Justice Dogar was born in the village of Gaarhi Mori, in Khairpur District, Sindh province. He passed LLB from Law College, Punjab University, Lahore in 1969. He was enrolled as Advocate in 1970 and practiced law for 25 years before his elevation to judiciary. He also attended Third Lawyers Courses/Lectures in Shariah in 1991 in International Islamic University, Al-Azhar University, Umm al-Qura University, and Islamic University of Madinah.

Posts held in Bar

 General Secretary, District Bar Association Khairpur during 1973–1974.
 Joint Secretary, High Court Bar Association, Sukkur Bench during 1984–85.
 President, District Bar Association Khairpur during 1987–88, 1989–90; 1991–92, 1993–94 and 1994–95.

Posts held in other fields

 Elected Vice-Chairman, District Council, Khairpur 1979–1983.
 Member Sindh Madressah Board, Karachi 1980–1983.
 Member, Board of Governors, Board of Intermediate & Secondary Education, Sukkur 1988–1990.
 Honorary Secretary, District Red Crescent Society Khairpur 1980–1985.
 Member, Syndicate, Shah Abdul Latif University, Khairpur from 1996 to April 2000.
 Chairman Board of Governors IBA from 7 March to 27 April 2000.
 Nominated as Member Board of Governors, National University of Modern Languages, Islamabad in March 2003.
 Nominated as Judge-in-Charge/Chairman of Supreme Court Employees Cooperative Housing Society, Islamabad in April 2004.
 Nominated as Member Board of Governors National University of Modern Languages, Islamabad in March 2003.
 Nominated as Acting Chief Election Commissioner from 10 July 2004 to 3 August 2004, from 30 November 2004 to 6 December 2004 and 15 February 2005 to 16 March 2006.

Judicial career

Mr Dogar joined the judicial service on 10 April 1995 with an appointment to the Sindh High Court.

He was elevated to the Supreme Court on 28 April 2000.

Following the Proclamation of Emergency by Chief of Army Staff General Pervez Musharraf, Dogar was appointed as Chief Justice of Pakistan. He took oath on Provisional Constitutional Order (PCO) on 3 November 2007. Earlier a 7-member bench of the Supreme Court had overturned the PCO. Dogar was one of the only four sitting judges in Supreme Court who immediately took oath under the PCO 2007 on 3 November 2007, when the majority of Supreme Court judges refused to take oath under the PCO. The others judges who took the PCO oath with him were Muhammad Nawaz Abbasi, Faqir Muhammad Khokhar and M. Javed Buttar. Later in the evening, in Karachi Saiyed Saeed Ashhad also took oath on PCO on 3 November 2007.

Chief Justice Abdul Hameed Dogar took a new oath on 15 December 2007, this time on the constitution.

He retired from Supreme Court on 21 March 2009.

On 31 July 2009, in a landmark verdict, the Supreme Court of Pakistan termed as illegal and unconstitutional the appointment of Abdul Hameed Dogar as Chief Justice.

Controversies

Oath on PCO 1999
On 26 January 2000 the higher judiciary was asked to take fresh oath of office under the PCO 1999 by the Chief Executive General Pervez Musharraf. Justice Dogar as the sitting judge of Sindh High Court took oath.
On 31 July 2009, the Supreme court of Pakistan unanimously declared in a judgement that Musharff's act of 3 November 2007 to impose the emergency as a Chief of Army Staff was unconstitutional and unlawful. Consequently, in the absence of consultations made by the de jure Chief Justice of Pakistan, all the nominations made by the De facto Chief Justice Abdul Hameed Dogar during his tenure were held to be null and void.

PCO 2007 Oath and Appointment as Chief Justice of Pakistan
On 3 November 2007, the then Chief of the Army Staff Gen. Pervez Musharaf declared emergency in Pakistan and issued a Provisional Constitutional Order (PCO). A seven bench supreme court bench headed by the Chief Justice Iftikhar Muhammad Chaudhry issued an order that declared emergency illegal and ordered that no judge shall take oath on PCO.

Mr. Dogar along with 3 other judges immediately took the oath under PCO. Mr Dogar was appointed as the Chief Justice of this newly constituted Supreme Court. On 23 November 2007, Mr Dogar and the newly constituted bench consisting of Ijaz-ul-Hassan Khan, Muhammad Qaim Jan Khan, Musa K. Leghari, Ch. Ijaz Yousaf, Muhammad Akhtar Shabbir and Zia Pervez declared that all judges, including the then Chief Justice Iftikhar Muhammad Chaudhry, who did not take oath on PCO, are deemed to have been removed from the bench
.

In a later development, on 3 December 2007 federal government issued notification of removal of three justices of Supreme Court without any retirement privileges. They were: Chief Justice Iftikhar Muhammad Chaudhry, Justice Rana Bhagwandas and Justice Khalil-ur-Rehman Ramday.

On 21 March 2009 when Mr. Justice Dogar retired from the bench as the Chief Justice of Pakistan, the Chief Justice Iftikhar Muhammad Chaudhry, who was declared to have ceased to hold the office by the bench headed by Chief Justice Abdul Hameed Dogar, was notified as restored to bench as Chief Justice. Since Iftikhar Muhammad Chaudhry after 3 November 2007 was not re-appointed as Justice and also never re-took oath of office, legality of appointment of Mr Dogar as Chief Justice is questionable and Mr Dogar is considered as a de facto Chief Justice rather than de jure.

Bank loan
Mr. Justice Dogar purchased a house which was already on loan granted to earlier owner. Thus, the same liability was transferred on him. A loan of Rs. 8.93 million from the National Bank of Pakistan has been paid by him and nothing is outstanding any more.

Reassessment of daughter's FSC results
In 2008, an investigative report by The News International found out that Justice Dogar's daughter Farah Hameed Dogar examination paper for F.Sc. were reassessed in violation of previous Supreme Court rulings. While the results of 201 candidates were revised, only for Farah were the examination papers re-marked and the numbers increased. In the other 200 cases, only errors in adding the total marks were corrected.

References

External links
Hon'ble Mr. Justice Abdul Hameed Dogar (Supreme Court)
Justice Abdul Hameed Dogar has been appointed as the Chief Justice, replacing Justice Iftikhar (Dawn News)
Bio-data of newly appointed CJP (APP)

1944 births
Chief justices of Pakistan
Living people
Pakistani judges
People from Khairpur District